Americans for Technology Leadership is a coalition of technology professionals, companies and organizations that advocates limited government regulation of technology. It has been described as a Microsoft front organization and has been cited as an example of astroturfing.

In 2001, the Los Angeles Times reported that hundreds of similar letters were sent to newspapers voicing disagreement with the United States Department of Justice and its antitrust suit against Microsoft. The letters, prepared by Americans for Technology Leadership and Citizens Against Government Waste, had in some cases been mailed from deceased citizens or nonexistent addresses. 

The founding members of the coalition are:
 Association for Competitive Technology
 Citizens Against Government Waste
 Cityscape Filmworks
 Clarity Consulting
 CompTIA
 CompUSA
 Microsoft Corporation
 60Plus Association
 Small Business Survival Committee
 Staples, Inc.

References

External links
 official website

Political advocacy groups in the United States